Imre Bíró (born 17 April 1958) is a Romanian former football striker.

International career
Imre Bíró played one game at international level for Romania, being used by coach Ștefan Kovács in a friendly which ended with a 1–0 victory against Poland.

References

1958 births
Living people
Romanian footballers
Romania under-21 international footballers
Romania international footballers
Association football forwards
Liga I players
Liga II players
Nemzeti Bajnokság I players
Nemzeti Bajnokság II players
ASA Târgu Mureș (1962) players
FC Politehnica Iași (1945) players
FC Universitatea Cluj players
Győri ETO FC players
FC Sopron players
Romanian expatriate footballers
Expatriate footballers in Hungary
Expatriate sportspeople in Hungary
Romanian expatriates in Hungary
Romanian expatriate sportspeople in Hungary